Deans Brook is a two-kilometre-long stream which runs between Mill Hill and Edgware in the London Borough of Barnet. It is a tributary of the Silk Stream, which is a tributary of the River Brent, which is a tributary of the River Thames.

The brook rises on Mill Hill Golf Course, where it is dammed to form a large pond called Stoneywood Lake. It goes through a culvert under the M1 motorway to Stoneyfields Park, where it is again dammed to form an ornamental lake. It then passes through suburban Edgware, where it combines with the Edgware Brook to become the Silk Stream near Edgware Hospital.

The stream largely follows its natural course, but most of the banks are restrained by wooden boards, and there is little aquatic vegetation. Kingfishers and grey wagtails are regularly seen along the brook. A tributary, Edgwarebury Brook, joins it behind Brook Avenue.

The only part of the brook which is accessible to the public is in Stoneyfields Park. Deans Brook, Stoneyfields Park, allotments to the east of Edgware Hospital, and wetland south of Edgware Underground station sidings together form a Site of Borough Importance for Nature Conservation, Grade II.

See also
 Nature reserves in Barnet

References

External links 
 Sources of the Silk Stream

Rivers of London
Nature reserves in the London Borough of Barnet
2Deans